Niels Erik Andersen (born 25 September 1945) is a former Danish football player, who played 140 games for the Danish club Vejle Boldklub. He also represented the Danish national team.

External links
  Vejle Boldklub
  Danish national team profile

Living people
1945 births
Danish men's footballers
Denmark international footballers
Denmark under-21 international footballers
Vejle Boldklub players
Association football midfielders